The Huanghai Challenger (挑战者SUV) or Shuguang Challenger is a mid-size SUV  manufactured by Huanghai Auto of SG Automotive (曙光汽车) from 2009 to 2012.

Huanghai Challenger, Huanghai Navigator, Huanghai Dawn, and Huanghai Falcon 

The Huanghai Challenger was sold with the Huanghai Navigator, Huanghai Dawn, and Huanghai Falcon names depending on the region and year of the model. Different codes were given to the different models, but the specifications and styling remains largely the same. Prices of the Huanghai Challenger ranges from 69,800 to 81,800 yuan.

Gonow Kairui/ Kaixuan and Gonow Troy 100/200 

The Gonow Victor (凯睿-Kairui) and Gonow Victory (凯旋-Kaixuan) are both mid-size SUV that shares the same platform as the Huanghai Challenger. Manufactured by Gonow from 2005 to 2009, the SUVs also spawned pickups called the Gonow Troy 100 (GA100-财运100) and Gonow Troy 200 (GA200-财运200) that shares the same exterior styling. The Troy 100 was priced from 52,900 yuan to 59,800 yuan.

Gonow Jetstar SUV and Gonow Troy 300 

The Gonow Jetstar SUV (帅舰-Shuaijian) was a mid-size SUV that shares the same platform as the Huanghai Challenger. The Gonow Jetstar was manufactured by Gonow from 2007 to 2009 with a price of 79,800 yuan. 

The facelift versions of the Jetstar SUV were called the Gonow Shuaiwei (帅威) and Gonow Shuaichi (帅驰). Both models ceased production in 2008.

The Gonow Troy 300 (财运300) was a mid-size pickup that is essentially the pickup version of the Gonow Jetstar SUV which shares the same platform as the Huanghai Challenger.

References

External links 

 SG Automotive official site

Challenger
Cars introduced in 2006
Mid-size sport utility vehicles
Cars of China